Peter Jensen may refer to:

Sports
 Peter Jensen (psychologist) (born 1946), Canadian Olympic trainer and sports psychologist
 Peter Aagaard Jensen (born 1956), Danish sport shooter
 Peter Skov-Jensen (born 1971), Danish football player
 Peter Friis Jensen (born 1988), Danish professional football goalkeeper
 Peter Vindahl Jensen (born 1998), Danish footballer

Other
 Peter Jensen (orientalist) (1861–1936), professor and German orientalist
 Peter L. Jensen (1886–1961), inventor of the first loudspeaker
 Peter Herbert Jensen (1913–1955), German physicist
 Kris Jensen (Peter Kristian Jensen, 1942), American pop musician
 Peter Jensen (bishop) (born 1943), Anglican Archbishop of Sydney, Australia
 Peter Aalbæk Jensen (born 1956), Danish film producer
 Peter Jensen (fashion designer) (born 1969), fashion designer

See also
Peder Jensen (disambiguation)